Lisa A. Bartlett (née Sato) is an American politician and former businesswoman. Bartlett is the former Orange County supervisor for district 5. Bartlett is the former mayor of Dana Point, California. She is a Republican.

Early life
Bartlett was born in Culver City, and moved to Orange County when she was three years old. She is of Japanese descent.

Political career

Dana Point City Council
Bartlett's political career started in 2006, when she was elected to the Dana Point city council. She was reelected to a second term in 2010 and for two years she was mayor (in 2009 and in 2014).

Orange County Board of Supervisors
In 2014, she ran for the fifth district seat on the Orange County board of supervisors.  She finished in second place in the June primary but defeated Laguna Niguel city councilman Robert Ming in the November runoff.  In 2018, she was re-elected, having run unopposed.

She served as chair of the Orange County board of supervisors in 2016 and 2019.

U.S. House campaign

On January 3, 2022, Bartlett announced that she would be a candidate for the United States House of Representatives in California's 49th congressional district, running against incumbent Democrat Mike Levin. She finished third in the nonpartisan primary, behind Levin and former San Juan Capistrano Mayor Brian Maryott, and did not advance to the general election.

References

External links 
 County supervisor website
 Lisa Bartlett at ballotpedia.org

21st-century American women politicians
American politicians of Japanese descent
American women business executives
American women of Japanese descent in politics
California city council members
Candidates in the 2022 United States House of Representatives elections
Asian-American city council members
California politicians of Japanese descent
California Republicans
Living people
Orange County Supervisors
Women city councillors in California
Women mayors of places in California
Year of birth missing (living people)
Asian conservatism in the United States